Michaelsville is an unincorporated community in Franklin Township, Grant County, Indiana.

History
Michaelsville once contained a post office, called Michael, which operated from 1892 until 1902. William Michael served as postmaster.

Geography

References

Unincorporated communities in Grant County, Indiana
Unincorporated communities in Indiana